The following is a list of cemeteries in Hong Kong.

Hong Kong Island
 Aberdeen Chinese Permanent Cemetery (BMCPC)
 Carmelite Cemetery
 Chiu Yuen Cemetery, Mount Davis – Private cemetery of Hotung clan
 Hong Kong Chinese Christian Churches Union Pok Fu Lam Road Cemetery
  - Former cemetery. Wah Fu Estate was built at this location.
 Mount Caroline Cemetery (FEHD)
 Stanley Prison Cemetery (FEHD). Venue managed by the Correctional Services Department.
 Stanley Military Cemetery – Not only one of the major military cemeteries of Hong Kong, but also one of the last battlefields of Hong Kong Defence, 1941

Cape Collinson
 Cape Collinson Chinese Permanent Cemetery (BMCPC)
 Cape Collinson Military Cemetery – Buried for British military in Hong Kong, also this cemetery was managed by Commonwealth War Graves Commission
 Cape Collinson Muslim Cemetery aka. Chai Wan Muslim Cemetery - Adjacent to Chai Wan Mosque
 Holy Cross Catholic Cemetery
 Hong Kong Buddhist Cemetery
 Sai Wan War Cemetery – Most of the World War II of Hong Kong and East Asia Stage war dead are buried there

Happy Valley
 Happy Valley Jewish Cemetery, Hong Kong  c. 1855 and purchased by Sasson family
 Happy Valley Muslim Cemetery
 Hindu Cemetery – c. 1880s and includes a temple building
 Hong Kong Cemetery (FEHD) – Established in 1845. The early western cemetery in the early colonial era of Hong Kong
 Hong Kong Parsee Cemetery – c. 1852
 St. Michael's Catholic Cemetery

Kowloon and New Kowloon 
 Chinese Christian Cemetery – Kowloon City District
 Hau Pui Loong Cemetery. Former cemetery
 New Kowloon Cemetery No. 8 (Diamond Hill Urn Cemetery) (FEHD) - Diamond Hill. Officially designated in 1939, but may have been in use earlier. It was closed in 1961.
 St. Raphael's Catholic Cemetery – Cheung Sha Wan

New Territories 
 Fu Shan, in Tai Wai. Columbarium only
 Gallant Garden is the cemetery for civil and public servants who died in service
 Gurkha Military Cemetery – Built in Cassino Line (now San Tin Barracks) at San Tin of Yuen Long District
 Heung Shek Cemetery
 Po Fook Hill, in Sha Tin
 Sai Kung Catholic Cemetery 
 Sandy Ridge Cemetery (FEHD)
 Tao Fong Shan Christian Cemetery, part of Tao Fong Shan Christian Center
 Tseung Kwan O Chinese Permanent Cemetery (BMCPC)
 Tsuen Wan Chinese Permanent Cemetery (BMCPC)
 Wo Hop Shek Public Cemetery (FEHD) – largest in Hong Kong
 Tsang Tsui
 Private Family Cemetery of General Shen Hongying (沈鴻英私人墓園) in Pat Heung off Kam Po Road, adjacent to the Taoism Jiu Xiao Guan (Hong Kong)

Islands District
 Cheung Chau Catholic Cemetery
 Cheung Chau Cemetery (FEHD)
 Mui Wo Lai Chi Yuen Cemetery (FEHD)
 Tai O Cemetery (FEHD)

See also
 Cape Collinson Crematorium
 Tung Wah Coffin Home

References

Further reading

External links

 Opening hours of Cemeteries and Crematoria Services (Government of Hong Kong SAR, Food and Environmental Hygiene Department)

Hong Kong
 
Cemeteries